Lucía de Lourdes Sosa Robinzon (born February 6, 1957) is an Ecuadorian teacher, engineer, and politician, who was prefect of Esmeraldas Province from 2005 to 2013 and 2014 to 2018, and is currently mayor of the city of the same name.

Biography
Lucía Sosa entered the Rafael Palacios de Esmeraldas school, where she completed her primary education. She attended the Margarita Cortez and Luis Vargas Torres Normal schools, obtaining the title of Bachelor in Educational Sciences at the latter. At age 18, she met her future husband, Luis Antonio Pimentel.

She taught for 28 years, becoming known as an innovator. As president and vice president of the Unemployment Fund of the Ecuadorian Magisterium (FCME), she carried out works such as the completion of 250 homes, leading her to advance in politics.

She was elected with 47,579 votes, breaking the hold the Ecuadorian Roldosist Party (PRE) had had on the office for eight years.

While prefect, she gave birth to twins in July 2012.

Prefect of Esmeraldas Province
On January 5, 2005, Lucía Sosa took office as prefect of Esmeraldas. During her term she oversaw public works projects such as roads, bridges, and irrigation systems in the rural sector of the province. She promoted citizen participation in these works and the preparation of the budget.

She would assume the presidency of this entity in 2013 and 2017, and its vice presidency in 2012 and 2016 on behalf of Esmeraldas. She opposed the integration of La Concordia into Santo Domingo de los Tsáchilas Province.

After the 2016 earthquake, Sosa accused the central government of Rafael Correa of excluding Esmeraldas from reconstruction, while owing $14.6 million to the prefecture.

In 2017, she opposed a proposal that prefects be elected by the rural sector alone, indicating that it was unconstitutional and would bias the budget of prefectures in favor of the rural sector. During incidents on the Ecuadorian border with members of the Revolutionary Armed Forces of Colombia (FARC), she indicated that she had asked the Correa regime for more surveillance of the border by monitoring the northern zone by helicopter, but the idea was not acted on by the government.

At the end of 2018, Sosa resigned as prefect in order to participate as a candidate for mayor of the city of Esmeraldas.

Mayor of Esmeraldas
She took office on May 14, 2019, vowing to focus on reconstruction of municipal offices which were damaged in the previous month's earthquake.

References

External links

 

1957 births
20th-century Ecuadorian educators
Democratic People's Movement politicians
Living people
People from Esmeraldas Province
Provincial Prefects of Ecuador
Women mayors of places in Ecuador
21st-century Ecuadorian women politicians
21st-century Ecuadorian politicians